Félix Díaz Marcos (February 27, 1927 in Buenos Aires, Argentina – February 25, 2004 in Avellaneda, Argentina) was a footballer who played for clubs in Argentina and Chile.

Teams
 Racing Club 1940-1944
 Newell's Old Boys 1945
 Atlanta 1946
 Gimnasia y Esgrima de La Plata 1947
 Green Cross 1949–1952
 Santiago Wanderers 1953–1956

Honours
 Green Cross 1950 (Top Scorer Chilean Championship)

External links
 
 Félix Díaz at MemoriaWanderers.cl

1927 births
Living people
Footballers from Buenos Aires
Argentine footballers
Argentine expatriate footballers
Argentine Primera División players
Racing Club de Avellaneda footballers
Newell's Old Boys footballers
Club Atlético Atlanta footballers
Club de Gimnasia y Esgrima La Plata footballers
Chilean Primera División players
Santiago Wanderers footballers
Club de Deportes Green Cross footballers
Argentine expatriate sportspeople in Chile
Expatriate footballers in Chile
Association football forwards